Riffa is the second largest city in the Kingdom of Bahrain by area size. The city is completely located in the Southern Governorate.

The city is growing fast: during the 2001 census, the population was recorded as 79,550 but by 2008 it was estimated as 111,000.

History
Riffa was formerly the principal settlement on Bahrain Island, before being supplanted by the port of Manama over the course of the 19th century.

East Riffa 
East Riffa has many attractions; one such attraction is Riffa Fort, which is also known as Sheikh Salman Bin Ahmad Al Fateh Fort. The city has several shopping malls and two main shopping streets; Riffa Market (Souk ar-Rifa) and Bukuwara Street Market. The former is larger, while the latter is more organised and modernised. Playing golf in the Royal Golf Club is considered one of the top activities to do in the area. A new development, created by Arcapita, called Riffa Views, is a large residential and commercial center. The project includes artificial lakes, an international school, commercial districts, supermarkets, and will have access to the recently opened Royal Women's University. Enma Mall and Lulu Hypermarket Mall are new additions to the rapidly increasing commercial centers in East Riffa.

West Riffa
West Riffa is predominantly a residential area. Most of the ruling family, ministers and business investors live in West Riffa. King Hamad bin Isa Al Khalifa of Bahrain lives there, as well as the Prime Minister, Sheikh Khalifa bin Salman Al Khalifa. Riffa's famous clock tower is located in the centre of West Riffa.

West Riffa also has various landmarks including the Riffa Palace, where the former rulers of Bahrain, Sheikh Salman bin Hamad and Shaikh Isa bin Salman Al Khalifa lived. West Riffa also is home to well-known springs, Al Hunaynya and Umm Ghwayfa, once considered to be Bahrain's purest and finest water.

References

Citations

Bibliography
 .

External links
Satellite map at Maplandia.com

 
Populated places in the Southern Governorate, Bahrain